Ingrid Noack (born 10 April 1982) is a former Australian cricketer. A right-handed batter and right-arm off break bowler, she played five List A matches for Victoria in the Women's National Cricket League (WNCL) during the 2002–03 and 2003–04 seasons.

References

External links
 
 

1982 births
Living people
Australian cricketers
Australian women cricketers
Victoria women cricketers